The 1982 Barnet Council election took place on 6 May 1982 to elect members of Barnet London Borough Council in London, England. The whole council was up for election and the Conservative party stayed in overall control of the council.

Background

Election result
Overall turnout in the election was 43.3%.

|}

Ward results

Arkley

Brunswick Park

Burnt Oak

Childs Hill

Colindale

East Barnet

East Finchley

Edgware

Finchley

Friern Barnet

Garden Suburb

Golders Green

Hadley

Hale

Hendon

Mill Hill

St Paul's

Totteridge

West Hendon

Woodhouse

By-elections between 1982 and 1986

St Paul's

The by-election was called following the death of Cllr. William G. Hart.

References

1982
1982 London Borough council elections
May 1982 events in the United Kingdom